The Men's Parallel in the 2021 FIS Alpine Skiing World Cup involved only 1 event, a parallel giant slalom, due to the COVID-19 pandemic. Three additional parallel events, scheduled for Alta Badia, Davos, and Chamonix, were cancelled prior to the start of the season.  

The sole event was won by Alexis Pinturault, who thus won the season championship. This specific discipline includes both parallel giant slalom and parallel slalom races. At this time, individual parallel races were not included in the season finals, which were held in 2021 in Lenzerheide, Switzerland.

The season was interrupted by the 2021 World Ski Championships, which were held from 8–21 February in Cortina d'Ampezzo, Italy.  The men's parallel giant slalom was held on 16 February 2021.

Standings

DNS = Did Not Start
DNQ = Did Not Qualify

See also
 2021 Alpine Skiing World Cup – Men's summary rankings
 2021 Alpine Skiing World Cup – Men's Overall
 2021 Alpine Skiing World Cup – Men's Downhill
 2021 Alpine Skiing World Cup – Men's Super-G
 2021 Alpine Skiing World Cup – Men's Giant Slalom
 2021 Alpine Skiing World Cup – Men's Slalom
 World Cup scoring system

References

External links
 Alpine Skiing at FIS website

Men's Parallel
FIS Alpine Ski World Cup men's parallel discipline titles